South Russian State Polytechnic University or Platov South-Russian State Polytechnic University (also known as Novocherkassk Polytechnic Institute)  is a state university in the city of Novocherkassk, Rostov Oblast, Southern Russia.

History

In the Russian Empire 

The university during its nascent days were known as the Don higher educational institution. The institution was established with a background of the demands from the local authorities and the public in general for forming a university in the city of Novocherkassk, which started informally around 1870s. Consequently, some student unrest took place during 1905–1906. This event was followed by the approval of the Imperial Regulation of the Council of Ministers on 2 March 1907, and the university was legally established with the aim "to recognize the expediency of the establishment of the Don Polytechnic Institute in the city of Novocherkassk". Initial departments of the university included mining, engineering and melioration, mechanical, and chemical technologies.

On 5 October 1907, the Don Polytechnic Institute started to operate, while becoming the first higher educational institution in the southern part of the Russian Empire. At that time, the institute did not have its own buildings and was collectively operating in seven distinct closely located buildings.

In the year 1909, the institute was named after Tsarevich Alexei, and started to be known as  Alekseevsky Don Polytechnic Institute.

On 9 October 1911, construction began for own buildings of the university which were designed by Bronislaw Roguisky. This construction project included the main, robotic (modern name), chemical, mining corps and was finally completed in 1930.

After 1917 

During the years 1918 to 1920, the institution was named after Alexey Kaledin. Then the institution was renamed as Donskoy Polytechnic. In April 1930, the Don Polytechnic Institute was divided into several independent higher technical educational institutions which included:

 Energy
 Checmical Technology
 Geological Exploration
 Civil Engineering
 Aviation Engineering
 Metallurgical
 Agricultural engineering

On 21 March 1933, by order of the then People's Commissar for Heavy Industry Sergo Ordzhonikize, the geological exploration institute, chemical technology institute and energy institute were merged. Due to the result of such merger, the North Caucasian Industrial Institute was formed, which in 1934 was renamed as Novocherkassk Industrial Institute, named after Ordzhonikidze.

On 27 February 1948, via order No. 264 of the USSR Ministry of Higher Education Department, the institute received a new name – Novocherkassk Polytechnic Institute named after Sergo Ordzhonikidze. This name remained associated with the Institution until 1993.

In 1957, the institute was awarded the Order of the Red Banner of Labor.

On 5 July 1993, by order No. 55 of the State Committee of the Russian Federation for Higher Education Department, the university received a new status and the name was further changed to Novocherkassk State Technical University.

On 2 February 1999, by Order No. 226 of the Ministry of General and Professional Education of the Russian Federation, it was renamed again and this time the new name was South Russian State Technical University (Novocherkassk Polytechnic Institute).

On 19 August 2002, it was enrolled under the Unified State Register of Legal Entities as a state educational institution of higher education while retaining its previous name.

Later it was transformed into a federal state budgetary educational institution of higher professional education (FGBOU VPO), while the name remained unchanged.

On 25 October 2012, order No. 463 was adopted by the Government of the Rostov Region to assign the name of the university after M.I. Platov, which was supported by the petition of the university management dated 8 April 2013 No. 38-3 / 115. Consequently, on 24 June 2013, by order No. 482 of the Ministry of Education and Science of the Russian Federation, the university was decided to be renamed into FSBEI HPE South Russian State Polytechnic University (NPI) commemorating M.I. Platov.

During 18 and 19 October 2007, celebrations took place for marking the 100th anniversary of the oldest university in the southern Russia. In the mentioned days different events were held both in the city and the university arena itself. The celebrations began in the covered courtyard of the university and ended with a gathering in the city theater Komissarzhevskaya. On 17 October, the All Russian Exhibition Fair of Research Works and Innovation Activities was inaugurated at the university premises which was dedicated to the 100th anniversary of the foundation of the university. The opening ceremony was attended by the mayor of Novocherkassk, the head of the city duma and the top officials of the university. For commemorating the occasion, "Mail of Russia" produced 20 thousand envelopes and stamps with an image containing view of the main building of the university. In the workshop, which was the part of the event, Nikolai Shevkunov (Don medalist), commemorative medals were inaugurated.

Until 2008, there was a presidential governance system at the university, its last president was V.E. Shukshunov.

In 2014, the Expert RA agency included the university in its list of the best higher educational institutions of the Commonwealth of Independent States, where it was assigned a rating class "E".

Official names over time 

 1907 – Don Polytechnic Institute
 1909 – Alekseevsky Don Polytechnic Institute, in the honor of Tsarevich Alexei. There was a badge about graduation from the Alekseevsk Don Polytechnic Institute.
 1918 – Don Polytechnic Institute named after Ataman A.M. Kaledin, in honor of A.M. Kaledin
 1920 – Don Polytechnic Institute
 1930 – North Caucasian Industrial Institute, after division into several independent higher technical educational institutions, some of which in 1933 were re-united into a single institute.
 1934 – Novocherkassk Industrial Institute named after Sergo Ordzhonikidze. For some time the institute existed under the name of the Azov-Black Sea Industrial Institute.
 1948 – Novocherkassk Polytechnic Institute.
 1993 – Novocherkassk State Technical University, from 5 July.
 1999 – South-Russian State Technical University (Novocherkassk Polytechnic Institute), from 2 February.
 2013 – South-Russian State Polytechnic University (Novocherkassk Polytechnic Institute) named after MI Platov, from 24 June.

Rectors 
The list of Rectors of the university (chronologically as per year of appointment):

 1907 – Zinin, Nikolay Nikolaevich
 1910 – Zykov, Vladimir Pavlovich (April–August)
 1910 – Yupatov, Ivan Ferapontovich
 1917 – Abramov, Nikolay Matveyevich (March)
 1917 – Sushchinsky, Pyotr Petrovich
 1918 – Abramov, Nikolai Matveyevich (March − May)
 1918 – Uspensky, Nikolay Semyonovich
 1922 – Sushchinsky, Pyotr Petrovich
 1924 – Troitsky, Mikhail Viktorovich
 1926 – Sushchinsky, Pyotr Petrovich
 1928 – Egorshin, Vasily Petrovich
 1929 – Kasatkin, Vasily Nikolaevich
 1933 – Parshikov, Ivan Agafonovich
 1934 – Shumsky, Efim Grigorievich
 1935 – Khaletsky, Illarion Isaevich
 1936 – Vlasov, Victor Gavrilovich
 1938 – Semchenko, Dmitry Platonovich
 1939 – Shilnikov, Kuzma Afinogenovich
 1949 – Semchenko, Dmitry Platonovich
 1952 – Kobilev, Alexey Grigorievich
 1958 – Avilov-Karnaukhov, Boris Nikolaevich
 1963 – Frolov, Mikhail Alexandrovich
 1974 – Smirnov, Vladimir Alexandrovich
 1977 – Goncharov, Semyon Ivanovich
 1981 – Shukshunov, Valentin Efimovich
 1988 – Taranushich, Vitaly Andreevich
 1998 – Lunin, Leonid Sergeevich
 2009 – Perederiy, Vladimir Grigorievich
 2019 – Razoryonov, Yuri Ivanovich

Description

Academic structure of the university 

 10 faculties (including the faculty of open distance learning)
 4 institutes
 39 departments
 2 institutes as branches
 1 college
 inter-sectoral regional center for advanced training and professional retraining of specialists
 12 research institutes
 7 research and production enterprises
 publishing organizations and other departments that support the activities of the university

The SRSPU employs 3919 employees, including a teaching staff of 2054.

22,000 students study at its faculties and branches, including more than 15,000 full-time students, about 4,000 part-time students, and about 2,000 part-time education. More than 1,000 students undergo retraining every year.

The university houses the largest university scientific and technical library in the south of Russia. The library fund has more than 3 million publications.

The university employs the oldest primary trade union organizations of employees and students in the south of Russia.

Publications 

 "Personnel of Industry" is a large-circulation newspaper of the YRSPU (NPI). Published since December 1929.
 Scientific and technical journal "News of higher educational institutions. Electromechanics". Published since January 1958.

University staff

Faculty 

 255 doctors of sciences, professors
 1058 candidates of sciences, associate professors
 13 honored workers of science and technology
 2 honored cultural workers
 9 honored workers of higher education
 109 academicians of industry and public academies
 1 Corresponding Member of RAS

University buildings 

The campus of the South Russian State Polytechnic University includes:

 Main building
 Robotic building
 Chemical building
 Mountain body
 Energy building
 Laboratory building
 Educational library building (concert hall)
 Sports facilities (stadium, swimming pool, tennis court, gymnasium, athletics arena)

The main, chemical, mining and energy buildings are architectural monuments of federal significance.

In the twenty-first century, at the right entrance to the territory of the university, a checkpoint and a chapel were built in honor of the patroness of all students – the holy great martyr Tatiana.

Anthem 
The verse of Vladimir Abramovich Schwartz, a member of the university literary group, a 1964 NPI graduate – "I love you, NPI" is considered as the anthem of the university.

Research work 

The university is known for carrying out research activities in 26 different disciplines including powder metallurgy, theory of ore formation in volcanic sedimentary strata, micrometallurgy of Semiconductor structures, on antifriction materials, polymer synthesis, effective methods for solving problems of mathematical physics, simulator construction and others.

Research and development activities are carried out at different levels which include faculties, branch institutes, workshops (UPPK), Donskoy Technological Park, R&D centers and other divisions of the university. More than ten R&D centres function as part of SRSPU (NPI). Each includes one or more faculties, departments, research institutes (Scientific Research Institute) and other research and manufacturing departments of the university, as well as some non-department organizations, enterprises of the university. Six research institutes operate on the basis of departments, research laboratories, pilot production facilities of the university:

 Research Institute of Energy
 Research Institute of Water Supply and Sanitation
 Research Institute of Electromechanics
 Research Institute of Computing, Information and Control Systems
 Research Institute of the History of the Cossacks and the Development of Cossack Regions
 Center for Collective Use "Nanotechnology"

In 2010, SRSPU took 459th place (a total of 474 universities participated) in the ranking of scientific and publication activity of Russian universities, annually compiled by the Higher School of Economics.

Branches 
As of 2019, the university includes the following branches:

 Bagaevsky branch (recreation center)
 Kamensk Institute (branch) – opened in 1998
 Shakhty Institute (branch) – opened in 1958

Faculties 

The major faculties of the university includes:

 Faculty of Information Technology and Management
 Faculty of Geology, Mining and Oil and Gas Engineering
 Faculty of Mechanics
 Faculty of Civil Engineering
 Faculty of Technology
 Faculty of Energy
 Faculty of Innovation and Industrial Engineering
 Faculty of Transport and Logistics (existed from autumn 2018 to the end of winter 2020)
 Faculty of military training
 Faculty of Open and Distance Learning

Memory

Commemorative plaques 

The NPI main memorial plaque has the following text embedded:

 The complex of buildings of the Novocherkassk Polytechnic Institute (Main building. Chemical. Mining and energy) is an architectural monument of republican significance. Protected by the Law. The complex was built in 1911–1930. Designed by architect B. Roguisky (1861–1921).

It was installed on the facade of the main building on 28 December 1985. In 2010, in connection with the installation on the facade of the university, two new boards with the name of the university respectively in Russian language and English language was installed. At that time this board was moved to the right wing of the main building.

Many commemorative plaques were made and installed at the expense of specialized departments within the campus of the university. For example, at the Faculty of Mechanics, a plaque in memory of Professor AS Lyshevsky can be found; at the Faculty of Energy a plaque can be found mentioning – Honored Worker of Science and Technology, Professor A. D. Drozdov (in 1981); a similar plaque can be found at the Mining and Geological Faculty about Professor and Rector of NPI  M. A. Frolov (from 1963 to 1974). A memorial plaque was unveiled in memory of ND Mizerny, the first head of the military department of NPI (since 1944), who is a hero of the Soviet Union. This commemorative plaque was installed in 1983 with the assistance of the leadership of the military department. In 1980, on the occasion of the 100th birth anniversary of the geologist P.N. Chirvinsky, a memorial plaque was opened on the building of the Mining and Geological Faculty.

In the period from 1976 to 1985, 16 memorial plaques were unveiled on the NPI buildings. Before that there were only 4 memorial plaques and two monuments: a bust to the Hero of the Soviet Union G. Petrova and a monument erected in 1939 to S. Ordzhonikidze in the lobby of the main building whereas in 1983 it was dismantled as well.

Currently, SRSPU (NPI) has more than 28 memorial plaques on buildings and in subdivisions, including eight at its different departments.

Monuments 
Within the territory of the university and its outside, there are monuments erected in honor of the notable graduates.

Notable people who studied and worked in DPI-NPI-YURGTU-YRSPU 
During the Great Patriotic War, some of them fought and died at the front. A monument was erected in their honor near the left entrance to the territory of the institute. Near the right entrance there is a bust of Galina Petrova.

Among the graduates of the Novocherkassk Polytechnic University are:

 19 laureates of the Lenin Prize
 64 laureates of the State Prize
 35 honored workers of science and technology:
 Zubekhin, Alexey Pavlovich
 28 Heroes of Socialist Labor:
 twice Hero of Socialist Labor  – Smirnov, Leonid Vasilievich
 Mil, Mikhail Leontievich – MI helicopter designer
 Heroes of the Soviet Union and Russia:
  Vovchenko, Nikolay Dmitrievich
  Klimenko, Ivan Ivanovich
  Lobov, Georgy Ageevich
  Petrova, Galina Konstantinovna
  Simonov, Mikhail Petrovich
  Smolyanykh, Vasily Ivanovich
  Shelaev, Anton Stefanovich

Every year, usually in the summer, an official reunion of university graduates of different years of graduation take place.

Portrait gallery 
The gallery of portraits of university professors, created by artist Ivan Krylov is located on the second floor of the Main Building, on the outer wall of the assembly hall.

Interesting facts 

 In the Alekseevsk Don Polytechnic Institute, a non-periodical publication "News of the Testing Station of Materials" was published.
 In 1927, Anatolii Dorodnitsyn passed the entrance exams of the Novocherkassk Polytechnic University with honors but was not allowed to be admitted due to his "non-proletarian origin" (since father was a doctor and mother was a housewife). Anatoly had to get admitted to another educational institution for this reason.
 In September 1930, when the DPI was divided into several independent higher technical educational institutions, the Novocherkassk Aviation Institute (NAI) was created on the basis of its aviation faculty (opened in 1919). It was founded simultaneously with the aviation institutes in Moscow and Kharkov. Owing to the decision of the government in 1932, the Faculty of Aviation, Motor Building of the NAI was moved to Rybinsk, where the Rybinsk Aviation Institute (RAI) was established. In 1941 the RAI was further moved to the city of Ufa.
 During the occupation of Novocherkassk by German troops, the training of evacuated students and the work of NPI teachers continued at the Tomsk Polytechnic Institute.
 In the mid-'70s, the vocal-instrumental ensemble "Bliki" was invented by Alexander Shekhtman (now living in Israel) at the Faculty of Energy.
 In 2018, in Novocherkassk, a multi-part television film The Sky is Measured in Miles was filmed, of which some scenes were filmed at the institute.

See also 
 Peter the Great St. Petersburg Polytechnic University

References

External links 

  
 Official website  of Platov South-Russian State Polytechnic University
 Platov South-Russian State Polytechnic University at Facebook
 Platov South-Russian State Polytechnic University at Twitter
 Polytechnic Town Start
 NPI Alumni Club website

1899 establishments in the Russian Empire
Buildings and structures in Novocherkassk
Universities in Rostov Oblast
Educational institutions established in 1899
Public universities and colleges in Russia
Technical universities and colleges in Russia
Cultural heritage monuments in Novocherkassk
Cultural heritage monuments of federal significance in Rostov Oblast